Bharatpur State, which is also known as the Jat State of Bharatpur historically known as the Kingdom of Bharatpur, was a Hindu Kingdom in the northern part of the Indian subcontinent. It was ruled by the Sinsinwar clan of the Hindu Jats. At the time of reign of king Suraj Mal (1755–1763) revenue of the state was 17,500,000 rupees per annual.

History
The formation of the state of Bharatpur was a result of revolts by the Jats living in the region around Delhi, Agra, and Mathura against the imperial Mughals.  Gokula, a local Jat zamindar of Tilpat, led the first of such revolts in 1669. Even though the Jats were defeated and Gokula was executed, the movement was not completely crushed and discontent continued to simmer. In 1685, there was a second uprising of the Jats under RajaRam of Sinsini, that was better organized this time and used guerrilla warfare, combining it with loot and plunder. Now Aurangzeb approached the Kachhwaha ruler Bishan Singh to crush the uprising and appointed him as the faujdar of Mathura, granting him the entire area in zamindari. Conflict between Jats and Rajputs for zamindari rights also complicated the issue, with Jats primarily being landowners, whereas the Rajputs were primarily revenue collectors. The Jats put up a stiff resistance but by 1691, RajaRam Sinsini and his successor Churaman were compelled to submit to the Imperial Mughals. However unrest among Jats continued and later on in the beginning of the 18th century, Churaman, taking advantage of the Mughal civil wars, was able to oust the Rajputs from the area and establish an independent state where Jat chiefs formed the ruling class. Rajaram who also exhumed and burned the remains of Akbar is known for setting up a small fort at Sinsini. It was the key foundation of this kingdom.

The most prominent ruler of Bharatpur was Maharaja Suraj Mal. He captured the important Mughal city of Agra on 12 June 1761. He also melted the two silver doors of the famous Mughal monument Taj Mahal. Agra remained in the possession of Bharatpur rulers till 1774. After Maharaja Suraj Mal's death, Maharaja Jawahar Singh, Maharaja Ratan Singh and Maharaja Kehri Singh (minor) under resident ship of Maharaja Nawal Singh ruled over Agra Fort.

The Jats were later defeated by the Mughal army under the command of Mirza Najaf Khan in 1774. Mirza Najaf Khan re-captured most of the Jat lands including Agra and Aligarh.

In 1805, war between the British and the Holkars broke out. Maharaja Ranjit Singh of Bharatpur agreed to help the Holkar and the two Maharajas fell back to the Bharatpur fort. The British surrounded the fort and after three months, Ranjit Singh agreed to peace and signed a treaty with the British, thus becoming a princely state. Maharaja Jaswant Singh of Bharatpur provided great support for the British during the Indian Rebellion of 1857 and this aid was greatly acknowledged by the British. The young Maharaja was made a G.C.S.I and his personal gun salute was increased.

In August 1947, the state of Bharatpur acceded to the newly independent Dominion of India. In 1948, it became part of the Matsya Union and in 1949, it was absorbed into the state of Rajasthan. Members of the ruling family continue to be active in national and regional affairs. Several members of the family have served as members of parliament and in the state legislature.

Expansion and decline

In the 1760s, the Kingdom of Bharatpur reached its zenith and covered present day capital Delhi and district of Agra, Aligarh, Alwar, Bharatpur, Bulandshahr, Dholpur, Etah, Etawa, Faridabad, Firozabad, Ghaziabad, Gurgaon, Hathras, Jhajjar, Kanpur, Mainpuri, Mathura, Mewat, Meerut, Muzaffarnagar, Palwal, Rewari, and Rohtak. The areas under the control of Jats broadly included parts of modern eastern Rajasthan, southern Haryana, western Uttar Pradesh and Delhi.

The Jats were later defeated by the Mughal army under the command of Mirza Najaf Khan in 1774. Mirza Najaf Khan re-captured most of the Jat lands including Agra and Aligarh.

Military power
The Kingdom during Jawahar Singh's time had a large army of 25,000 Infantry, 15,000 Cavalry and 300 pieces of cannons with addition to the troops stationed at his forts.

Rulers
The chronology of Sinsinwar dynasty rulers is as follows:
 Badan Singh, 1722–1756. 1st Raja of Bharatpur 1722/1756, of Deeg and founder of Bharatpur; he was granted the title of Brijraj by Maharaja Jai Singh II on 23 November 1722; he constructed the Royal Palace and Gardens at Deeg as well as a temple at Dhir Samir ghat of Vrindavan; he was also an accomplished poet; he had 25 wives, including Rani Devki of a Jat family from Kama, and had issue, 26 sons. He died 7 June 1756 at Deeg.
 Maharaja Suraj Mal, 1756–1763. 2nd Maharaja of Bharatpur 1756/1763, born about 13 February 1707, created Raja Brajendra Bahadur, he took a large part in the numerous struggles of the first half of the 18th century between the Mughals, Marathas, Rohillas and Afghans and extended his borders; married 14 wives.
 Maharaja Sawai Jawahar Singh, 1763–1768 (son of Maharaja Brajendra Surajmal Bahadur by Rani Ganga), 3rd Maharaja of Bharatpur 1763/1768, was murdered at Agra in 1768 while hunting.
 Maharaja Ratan Singh, 1768–1769 son of Maharaja Brajendra Surajmal Bahadur by Rani Ganga), 4th Maharaja of Bharatpur 1768/1771 or 1768/1769, married and had issue. He too was murdered after a short reign.
 Maharaja Kehri Singh, 1769–1771, 5th Maharaja of Bharatpur 1771 or 1769/1776, died 1776.
 Maharaja Nawal Singh, 1771–1776 (son of Maharaja Brajendra Surajmal Bahadur by Rani Kavaria), Regent of Bharatpur 1771/1776, died 1776.
 Maharaja Ranjit Singh, 1776–1805 (son of Maharaja Brajendra Surajmal Bahadur by Rani Khet Kumari), 6th Maharaja of Bharatpur 1776/1805, during his reign, Najaf Khan, stripped the Jats of all their possessions leaving only the fort of Bharatpur and territory of nine lakhs in value; after Najaf Khan's death in 1782, Maharaja Scindia seized what was left but was persuaded by Suraj Mal's widow to restore 11 districts to which a further 3 districts were later added, which afterwards remained as Bharatpur State; he provided assistance to General Lake at Agra in 1803 and was rewarded with a number of districts, however the following year, in November 1804 at the Battle of Deeg, he made open war on the British forces, repelling four assaults on his fort, until after a nearly two month siege he was compelled to make peace and a new treaty was made on 4 May 1805, by which he was made to pay an indemnity of 20 lakhs, though he was confirmed in his possessions except for the parganas made over to him in 1803; married and had issue. He died in 1805.
 Maharaja Randhir Singh, 1805–1823, 7th Maharaja of Bharatpur, died 1823. An 1805 siege by the British ended in the latter's withdrawal.
 Maharaja Baldeo Singh, 1823–1825, 8th Maharaja of Bharatpur, married and had issue. He died in 1825.
 Maharaja Durjan Sal, 1825–1826, 9th Maharaja of Bharatpur  (usurper), opposed his cousin's accession and imprisoned him. British forces eventually laid siege to Bharatpur for three weeks and on 18 January 1826, the fort was stormed by troops under Lord Combermere and dismantled, the Maharaja was then imprisoned at Allahabad.
 Maharaja Balwant Singh, 1825–1853, 10th Maharaja of Bharatpur 1826/1853, born 1819, he was imprisoned by his cousin in 1825, but restored to the gadi in January 1826, under the Regency of his mother and the superintendence of the Political Agent, the Rani was removed later that same year and a Council of Regency was put in place; married and had issue. He died 1853.
 Maharaja Jaswant Singh, 1853–1893, 11th Maharaja of Bharatpur 1853/1893, born 1851, during his reign the State rendered loyal assistance to the British Government in 1857 and maintained order in the vicinity of Bharatpur; the state was administered by a Council under the Political Agent until 1872 when he was granted full ruling powers; married firstly, 1859, Maharani Bishan Kaur, daughter of Maharaja Narendra Singh of Patiala, married secondly, Maharani Darya Kaur, and had issue. He died 12 December 1893. Maharajkumar (name unknown) Singh (by Rani Bishan Kaur), died 4 December 1869. Maharaja Ram Singh (qv); Rao Raja Raghunath Singh, born 7 January 1887, educated at Mayo College, Ajmer 1895/1905 (Class-Captain 1903/1905), then with the Imperial Cadet Corps, Dehra Dun; he was appointed to the Bharatpur State Council in 1911, married and had issue. He died after 1930. Kunwar (name unknown) Singh, married and had issue. Kunwar (name unknown) Singh, married a daughter of Rai Amarjeet Singh of Kuchesar, and had issue.
 Shri Brijindar Si Maharaja Ram Singh Bahadur Jang, 1893 – 1900 (Exiled); 12th Maharaja of Bharatpur 1893/1900, born 9 September 1872 at Lohagarh, Bharatpur; installed 25 December 1893, removed from the administration of his state in 1895 and finally deposed in 1900 (#1); married firstly, Maharani Kishan Kaur, married secondly, Maharani Giriraj Kaur, died after 1918 and before 1931, and had issue, two sons and two daughters. He died 1929. Lt.Col. Shri Maharaja Shri Brajendra Sawai Kishen Singh Bahadur Jang (by Maharani Giriraj Kaur)(qv) Maharaj Giriraj Singh; Maharajkumari Gajindar Kaur; Maharajkumari Gokul Kaur
Maharani Giriraj Kaur, regent 1900–1918.
Lt.Col. Shri Maharaja Shri Brajendra Maharaja Kishen Singh Bahadur Jang, 1900–1929, 13th Maharaja of Bharatpur 1900/1929, born 4 October 1899, K.C.S.I. [cr.1926]; educated at Mayo College, Ajmer (College Diploma 1916) and for a short time at Wellington College, England in 1914; he was granted full ruling powers in November 1918, he was responsible for a number of reforms in the state of Bharatpur, including a reorganization of the army in 1919, Hindi was made the state language, primary education was made compulsory, Ayurvedic hospitals were set up, an exhibition to promote trade and arts was set up on an annual basis, the introduction of a system of participation of public in state affairs through credit banks, issuing society and village panchayat acts was started, the Brij-mandal in Shimla was established, and Social Reform Acts were enacted; he was appointed an Honorary Lieutenant-Colonel in the British Army on 24 October 1921, he presided over the Jat Mahasabha Adhiveshan organized at Pushkar in 1925; in consequence of the disorganisation of the State Administration and Finances he was deprived of his ruling powers in September 1928; married 3 March 1913, a daughter of Kunwar Gajindar Singh of Faridkot, died 18 August 1929, and had issue, four sons and three daughters. He died 27 March 1929 (#2). Shri Maharaja Shri Brajendra Sawai Vrijendra Singh Bahadur Jang (qv); Rao Raja Gajendra Singh [Girendra Raj Singh], died 1940. Rao Raja Edward Man Singh, born in July 1920 (1922?), married Rani Anant Mala, Princess of Kagal Junior, born 1926, died 1991, and had issue, three daughters. He died in February 1985. (Rajkumari Girrendra Kaur, born 5 November 1946, married 23 May 1972, Brig. Jitendra Pal Singh of Saidpur, and has issue, one son and one daughter. Kumari Gauri Singh; Kanwar Gaurav Singh; Rajkumari Ravindra Kaur, born 4 June 1952, unmarried. Rajkumari Krishnendra Kaur, born 10 April 1954, married 26 April 1982, Kanwar Vijay Singhji of Sihi, and has issue, one son and one daughter. Kumari Ambika Singh; Kanwar Dushyant Singh; Rao Raja Giriraj Saran Singh, born in September 1924?, M.P.(Lok Sabha) from Mathura, serving two terms, married firstly, January 1942 (div.1958), Maharajkumari Sushila Devi of Kapurthala, born 14 December 1918 at Kapurthala, died 1974 in Simla, married secondly, 1962, Mrs. Pamela Singh (divorced from her first husband), and had issue. He died December 1969. Rajkumar Anup Singh, born 25 December 1942, educated at Bishop Cotton School, Simla and Cornell University in the US, studying a course in agricultural management, married firstly, 1969 (div. 1974), Kumari Vijaya Kumari, born 1951, daughter of Thakur Gopal Singh of Bhajji State, a forest range officer better known as Mooshoo Mian, married secondly, May 1980, Surrinder Kaur, born 1946, a Sikh lady from Shahzadpur jagir in Haryana, no issue. Rajkumar Arun Singh [Prince Oogie], born 13 February 1947, educated at Bishop Cotton School, Simla and at St. Stephen's College, Delhi University; M.L.A. (three times) from Deeg constituency in Bharatpur District, first elected M.L.A.in 1993 as an independent. He was twice an independent M.L.A. and the third time he stood and won from the I.N.L.D. party ticket. He died unmarried 15 March 2006 at the All India Institute of Medical Sciences Hospital of kidney failure. His body was taken to Bharatpur on the same day, and he was given a state funeral (as he was an M.L.A.) at the Bharatpur Royal Cemetery. Maharajkumari Bibiji Kusum Kaur, married 1933, Kanwar Surendra Pal Singh of Unchagaon, Bulandshar District in the United Provinces. Maharajkumari Bibiji (name unknown) Kaur, died 19 May 1930 at Mussoorie. Maharajkumari Bibiji Padma Kaur (Kunwarani Vrish Bhan Kunwar), born 18 September 1919, married Kunwar Brijendra Singh of Moradabad District., and had issue. She died 1945 in Mysore.
 Colonel Shri Maharaja Brajendra Sawai Vrijendra Singh Bahadur Jang, 1929–1947 (Signed the instrument of accession to the Indian Union), 14th Maharaja of Bharatpur 1929/1995, born 1 December 1918; he succeeded to the gadi on 14 April 1929; Member of the Lok Sabha 1962/1971; married firstly June 1941, Yuvarajkumari Jaya Chamunda Ammani Avaru [the Maharani of Bharatpur], died 1954, daughter of Yuvaraja Sir Sri Kantirava Narasinharaja Wadiyar of Mysore, and his wife, Yuvrani Kempu Cheluvammanniyavaru, married secondly, 1961 (div. 1972), Maharani Videh Kaur of the Urs family of Mysore, born 1933, died 1985, by whom he had issue. He died 8 July 1995.

The line is nominally continued
 Shri Maharaja Shri Brajendra Sawai Vishvendra Singh Bahadur Jang, 15th Maharaja of Bharatpur.

Symbols

The former flag of the princely state was a rectangular tricolor with three horizontal stripes of saffron, white and blue. Its design and colour scheme happened to be very similar to the official flag that would be adopted for the future independent Dominion of India.

In the last three years before joining the Indian Union a new flag was adopted for Bharatpur that had a broad Chartreuse coloured band and the coat of arms in the middle. During that brief period (c.1943 – 1947) Bharatpur became the only political entity ever to have a chartreuse coloured flag. Bharatpur State also had an elaborate coat of arms.

See also
Deeg
Meo
Battle of Pichuna

References

Notes
Imperial Gazetteer of India Vol 8, P-73 Bharatpur State
R. C. Majumdar, H.C. Raychaudhury, Kalikaranjan Datta: An Advanced History of India, fourth edition, 1978, p. 535-36

Attribution

External links 
Bharatpur State at Britannica
 

History of Bharatpur, Rajasthan
Jat princely states
Princely states of Rajasthan
Rajputana Agency
States and territories established in the 17th century
States and territories disestablished in 1947
1722 establishments in India
1947 disestablishments in British India
1948 disestablishments in India